Arvind Khanna (born 29 May 1967) is an Indian politician, business magnate and philanthropist. He is a member of the Bharatiya Janata Party (BJP). Khanna is a senior leader of the BJP and a prominent figure in BJP Punjab. He is serving as Vice-President of BJP Punjab since December 2022. Khanna is noted politically for his wealth and philanthropy. He served as the member of legislative assembly (MLA) from Sangrur from 2002 to 2007 and the MLA from Dhuri from 2012 to 2014. He has also served as the General Secretary of the Punjab Pradesh Congress Committee (PPCC) and as the PPCC treasurer.

Khanna's business interests are in the defence, aerospace, technology and software industries. He has been noted in the media for being a powerful businessman. He was one of the first businesspeople in India to set up a private-sector defence company. Khanna's NGO, Umeed Foundation, is one of the largest NGOs in Punjab. He has also been involved in sports administration. Khanna has been the president of the Professional Golfers Association of India (PGI), the Secretary-General of the Punjab Olympic Association and the president of the Fencing Association of India.

Early life and education 

Arvind Khanna was born on 29 May 1967 in Delhi, India. Khanna is the second son and third child of business magnate, Vipin Khanna and Naginder Khanna. His elder siblings are Vinita and Navin, and his younger brother is Aditya. His mother, Naginder, was the daughter of Maharaja Bhupinder Singh of Patiala.

Khanna attended school at Millfield in Somerset, England. He then attended college at Pepperdien University in California, from where he graduated in 1989 with a degree in business management. During his time in university, Khanna lived in Beverly Hills, California. He has been a junior champion golfer in India, and has also played golf for Millfield, Pepperdine University and the Indian national men's team. In 1991, Khanna came back to Delhi and joined his family businesses.

Early political career 
Khanna was introduced to politics by Sukhbir Singh Badal, and joined the Shiromani Akali Dal in 1997. Khanna and Badal are close friends. After joining the party, he became the General Secretary of the Shiromani Akali Dal's youth wing.

Indian National Congress 
In 1998, he joined the Indian National Congress and served as the Punjab Pradesh Congress Committee (PPCC) party treasurer. Khanna has been elected twice as a member of the legislative assembly (MLA). In the 2002 Punjab Legislative Assembly election, Khanna contested from Sangrur and secured 42,339 votes (44.2%), winning by a margin of 19,132 votes. In 2004, he contested from the Sangrur Lok Sabha Constituency, and lost in a closely contested election against Sukhdev Singh Dhindsa. In the 2012 Punjab Legislative Assembly election, he won from Dhuri by securing 51,536 votes (45.65%). Khanna served as the General Secretary of the PPCC and was also attached to the Punjab Congress Committee (PCC) President's office.

Khanna wielded significant influence in the Punjab Congress because of his vast personal fortune and his relationship with Amarinder Singh, former Chief Minister of Punjab. Khanna and Singh are first cousins, and they are related through Khanna's mother, Naginder, who was Singh's paternal aunt. During his time in the Congress Party, Khanna was Singh's right hand man and controlled access to Singh. Khanna would regularly provide his private jet and helicopter for Singh's use. Khanna also gained control over the Punjab Congress' political strategy by using his personal fortune to fund Singh's office during his second term as PCC President, and hiring managers to monitor, coordinate and schedule Singh's meetings. In his visits to Chandigarh, Singh would stay in Khanna's house in Sector 10.

However, in May 2014, he resigned as an MLA, and then left the Congress Party in 2015. Khanna stated that his reasons for leaving politics were to focus on his businesses and spend time with his family. It was also reported that he was discontent with the Punjab Congress and its leadership, which Khanna himself stated to be true.  During his time in the Punjab Congress, Khanna was the party's main financial benefactor.

Bharatiya Janata Party 

In 2021, speculation arose in the media that Khanna may be joining the Shiromani Akali Dal, and contesting from Sangrur in the 2022 elections. In January 2022, Khanna reentered politics and joined the ruling Bharatiya Janata Party, in the presence of Union Cabinet Ministers, Gajendra Singh Shekhawat and Hardeep Singh Puri. Khanna is a senior leader of the BJP and an influential figure in BJP Punjab. He contested from Sangrur in the 2022 Punjab Legislative Assembly Elections. Khanna is considered to be the most prominent of the politicians that joined BJP Punjab before the 2022 Punjab Legislative Assembly Elections.

BJP Punjab 
Khanna has been involved in growing the BJP's standing and influence in Punjab through recruiting senior leaders from rival political parties. In May 2022, Khanna was among the BJP leaders, which included Minister of Home Affairs Amit Shah, BJP National President J.P Nadda, Manjinder Singh Sirsa and Parminder Singh Brar, that welcomed former Congress leader Sunil Jakhar to the BJP.

In June 2022, several senior Punjab politicians, including 4 former Punjab Cabinet Ministers from the Indian National Congress, joined the BJP in the presence of Amit Shah and other BJP leaders, which included Khanna, Gajendra Singh Shekhawat, a BJP National General Secretary Dushyant Kumar Gautam, Sunil Jakhar, BJP Punjab State President Ashwani Kumar Sharma and Manjinder Singh Sirsa.

In December 2022, Khanna was appointed as Vice-President of BJP Punjab. He was also appointed to BJP Punjab's newly formed finance committee. In March 2023, he was put in charge of managing the Jalandhar West Assembly constituency for the Jalandhar Lok Sabha constituency by-election in the same year.

In the Punjab opposition 
In September 2022, Khanna spoke at the mock Punjab Assembly session that was organised by the BJP against the Aam Adami Party (AAP) Government in Punjab. In August 2022, Khanna and other senior BJP leaders met with Prime Minister Narendra Modi during his visit to Mohali and discussed issues the state is facing, which included Modi stating his concerns about Punjab's depleting water table. In October 2022, Khanna accompanied Hardeep Singh Puri, the Minister of Petroleum and Natural Gas and the Minister of Housing and Urban Affairs, to the inauguration of Asia's largest compressed biogas plant in Lehragaga, Sangrur district. The plant was commissioned by Verbio, a German bioenergy company. He has also criticised the AAP Government in Punjab for not adequately handling lawlessness incidents in the state.

Electoral performance

Punjab Assembly

2022

2012

2002

Business career 

Khanna's business interests are in the defence, aerospace, technology and software industries. His company, TSL Defence Technologies, was founded in 2001 and was one of the first private sector defence companies in India. TSL Defence Technologies was also one of the first 9 Indian private sector companies to receive a defence manufacturing license. In 2008, Khanna founded ASAS Investments, which has business interests both in India and in foreign countries. ASAS Investments provides market research, market analysis and advisory services to international companies that are looking to enter the Indian market and Indian companies that are looking for opportunities abroad. The company also takes strategic investments in startups and other businesses which require either capital, a strategic advisor or access to connections in India or globally.

Khanna has used his connections with international companies to introduce advanced hardware and software technologies to the Indian defence, aerospace and telecom industries. Other companies Khanna has founded include ASAS Global Services, ASAS Tech Solutions, ASAS Tech, Root Invest, Umeed Urban Solutions, Umeed Projects and Tiger Sports. He has also been one of the owners of Punjab Kings, an Indian Premier League cricket team.

Khanna's father, Vipin Khanna, was allegedly one of the biggest and most powerful arms dealers in India. Allegedly, Khanna is also a key figure in the defence industry of India. Khanna and his family have been investigated and accused in several arms deals. However, the investigations into Khanna and his family have never resulted in any convictions and have never proved any wrongdoing.

In 2000, the Indian Navy had placed a purchase order for seven Barak anti-missile defence systems and 200 Barak missiles, from Israel Aerospace Industries (IAI), an Israeli defence and aerospace company. In 2007, Khanna and his family were accused by the Central Bureau of Investigation (CBI) of having influenced the deal in favour of IAI, receiving kickbacks from the company, and it was also suspected that companies owned by Khanna and his family had received huge payments from IAI. Eventually, the case against Khanna and his family was dropped due to lack of evidence.

In 2003, Denel, a South African defence and aerospace company, had received an order by the Indian Army to supply 1200 bunker buster anti-material rifles. In 2005, Khanna and his family were accused for allegedly facilitating the deal. The CBI had suspected Khanna and his family of receiving 12.75% in commissions for being able to clinch the contract in Denel's favour, and to influence the Indian Ministry of Defence's Price Negotiation Committee. However, Khanna and his family denied any involvement in the Denel deal, and eventually, the CBI dropped the case due to lack of evidence.

In 2009, Israel Military Industries (IMI), an Israeli weapons manufacturer, was awarded a contract by the Ordnance Factory Board (OFB) to build a factory to produce artillery charges. The CBI accused Khanna's company, TSL Defence Technologies, and its employees on influencing the contract selection on IMI's behalf with senior members of the OFB. The Delhi High Court later acquitted Khanna and his company, and gave them a clean chit. In addition to this, the Delhi High Court also levied a fine on the Ministry of Defence for falsely implicating Khanna's company in the case.

Philanthropy 

In 1997, Khanna founded an NGO named Umeed (which translates to hope in Hindi), in Sangrur. Umeed is one of Punjab's largest NGOs. Since it was founded, Umeed has reached out to 550 villages and has helped 12 million people. Umeed's initiatives are primarily focused on the economic and social empowerment of women, providing healthcare and employment generation. The NGO has also been supported by various organizations that include the Council of People’s Action and Rural Technology (CAPART), Medanta, Cipla, Mohandai Oswal Hospital, the Australian High Commission in India and the Government of Japan.

Sports 
Khanna has competed in golf tournaments in India, and has also been the president of the Professional Golfers Association of India (PGI). Khanna has been instrumental in growing and popularising professional golf in India. Khanna's company, Tiger Sports, set up, managed and marketed the first Professional Golf Tour of India in 2006. He has also helped and supported young Indian golfers with their international promotions. He financially assisted golfer Smriti Mehra in the 1990s, when she was competing in tournaments in the Unites States. Khanna is one of the owners of Christie’s Golf, a Delhi Golf Club League team.

Khanna has served as the Secretary-General of the Punjab Olympic Association and as the president of the Fencing Association of India as well.

Personal life 
Khanna is married to Shagun Khanna, a lifestyle blogger. They have two sons, Adhiraj and Suryaveer.

References

External links 
 

1967 births
Punjab, India politicians
Bharatiya Janata Party politicians from Punjab
Indian businesspeople
Businesspeople from Delhi
Living people
Indian philanthropists
Arms traders
Defence industry of India
Indian aviation businesspeople
Indian technology businesspeople
Khanna family
Indian Premier League franchise owners
Punjabi Hindus
People educated at Millfield
Pepperdine University alumni